Eucalyptus gunnii, commonly known as cider gum, is a species of small to medium-sized tree endemic to the island of Tasmania, Australia. It has mostly smooth bark, lance-shaped to egg-shaped adult leaves, flower buds in groups of three, white flowers and cylindrical to barrel-shaped fruit.

Description
It has smooth, mottled, white or grey bark, sometimes with persistent rough bark on the lower trunk. Young plants and coppice regrowth have sessile leaves arranged in opposite pairs. Juvenile stems can be rounded or square in cross section.

It flowers in most months and the flowers are white.

Taxonomy and naming
Eucalyptus gunnii was first formally described in 1844 by the British botanist Joseph Dalton Hooker in the London Journal of Botany. The type material was collected "on the elevated tablelands of the interior of Tasmania, especially in the neighborhood of the lakes" by Ronald Campbell Gunn. The specific epithet honours the collector of the type material.

Joseph Maiden's 1889 book The Useful Native Plants of Australia’ recorded that common names in Tasmania are "cider gum" and in southeastern Australia occasionally as the "sugar gum" and that in the same part it is known as "white gum", "swamp gum" or "white swamp gum". In the Noarlunga and Rapid Bay districts of South Australia it is known as "bastard white gum", occasionally as "yellow gum." Near Bombala, New South Wales two varieties go by the names of "flooded or bastard gum" and "red gum", although the species only occurs in Tasmania.

Distribution and habitat

Use in horticulture
This plant has gained the Royal Horticultural Society's Award of Garden Merit. This species is noted for exceptional cold tolerance for a eucalyptus (to −14 °C, exceptionally −20 °C for brief periods) and is now commonly planted as an ornamental tree across the British Isles and some parts of western Europe.

Uses
The fragrant leaves give off essential oils when they are creased or burned, which are used in different forms (floral composition, infusion, tincture, oil, etc) to treat many respiratory diseases, rheumatism, migraines, fatigue and as antiseptic.

The indigenous people of Tasmania used the sap of the tree to produce a fermented beverage called way-a-linah.

Gallery

References

gunnii
Trees of Australia
Myrtales of Australia
Flora of Tasmania
Endemic flora of Tasmania
Trees of mild maritime climate
Ornamental trees
Taxa named by Joseph Dalton Hooker
Plants described in 1844